is a railway station in the city of  Ōsaki, Miyagi Prefecture, Japan, operated by East Japan Railway Company (JR East).

Lines
Tajiri Station is served by the Tōhoku Main Line, and is located 401.1 rail kilometers from the official starting point of the line at Tokyo Station.

Station layout
The station has two ground-level opposed side platforms connected to the station building by a footbridge. The station is unattended.

Platforms

History
Tajiri Station opened on December 25, 1908. The station was absorbed into the JR East network upon the privatization of the Japanese National Railways (JNR) on April 1, 1987.

Passenger statistics
In fiscal 2017, the station was used by an average of 434 passengers daily (boarding passengers only).

Surrounding area
Tajiri High School
Tajiri Town Hall
Tajiri Community Center

See also
 List of Railway Stations in Japan

References

External links

  

Railway stations in Miyagi Prefecture
Tōhoku Main Line
Railway stations in Japan opened in 1908
Ōsaki, Miyagi
Stations of East Japan Railway Company